Steffen Borries O. Cranmer (born 8 May 1934) is a British former sports shooter. He competed at the 1952 Summer Olympics, 1956 Summer Olympics and 1960 Summer Olympics.

References

1934 births
Living people
British male sport shooters
Olympic shooters of Great Britain
Shooters at the 1952 Summer Olympics
Shooters at the 1956 Summer Olympics
Shooters at the 1960 Summer Olympics
Sportspeople from Copenhagen
20th-century British people